Virgo (Latin for "virgin" or "maiden") is the sixth astrological sign in the zodiac. It spans the 150–180th degree of the zodiac. Under the tropical zodiac, the Sun transits this area (on average) between August 23 and September 22. Depending on the system of astrology, individuals born during these dates may be called Virgos or Virgoans. 

The sign is associated with Astraea. In Greek mythology, Astraea was the last immortal to abandon Earth at the end of the Silver Age, when the gods fled to Olympus – hence the sign's association with Earth. She became the constellation of Virgo. Virgo is one of the three Earth signs, along with Capricorn and Taurus.

Origins

The constellation Virgo has many different origins, depending on mythology. Most myths view Virgo as a virgin maiden that carries her associations with wheat. In Greek and Roman mythology, the constellation is related to Demeter, the Greek goddess of the harvest, or her daughter Persephone, queen of the Underworld. Others associate it with the myth of Parthenos, which explains how the constellation Virgo came to be.

In the legend, Parthenos is the daughter of Staphylus and Chrysothemis, and sister to Rhoeo and Molpadia. Apollo had impregnated Rhoeo, but when her father discovered her pregnancy, he assumed it was from a random suitor and was greatly ashamed. As her punishment, he locked her in a box and cast it into a river. After the fate of their sister, Parthenos and Molpadia lived in fear of their father's terrible wrath. One evening, Staphylus left his daughters in charge of a valuable bottle of wine. When they both accidentally fell asleep, one of their slimes broke the bottle. Fleeing in terror from their father's wrath, the sisters ran to the edge of a nearby cliff and threw themselves off. Due to his previous relations with Rhoeo, Apollo saved the two sisters and delivered them to the safety of the nearby cities in Cherronseos. Moldavia settled in Castabus, where she changed her name to Hemithea and was worshipped as a local goddess for many years. Parthenos resided in Bubastis, where she was also worshipped as a local goddess. According to another story, Parthenos was the daughter of Apollo, who made the constellation to commemorate her death at a young age.

In another Greek myth, Virgo is the Athenian maiden Erigone, daughter of Icarius. After Icarius was murdered by his shepherds in a drunken rage, Erigone hung herself out of grief, and her dog Maera committed suicide. Zeus or Dionysus pitied the family and placed them in the sky as constellations: Erigone became Virgo, Icarius became Bootes, and Maera became Canis Minor.

In Egyptian mythology, the time when the Sun was in the constellation Virgo marked the beginning of the wheat harvest, connecting Virgo to the wheat grain. In Christianity, Jesus was born to a virgin in the town of Bethlehem; the ancient Zodiac ended in the constellation Leo and began with Virgo. A comparable sign to Virgo in Indian astrology is Kanya (meaning "maiden"), and she has even been connected with the Virgin Mary.

See also

Astronomical symbols
Chinese zodiac
Circle of stars
Cusp (astrology)
Elements of the zodiac

References

Works cited

 Longitude of Sun, apparent geocentric ecliptic of date, interpolated to find time of crossing 0°, 30°....

External links 
 Warburg Institute Iconographic Database (over 400 medieval and early modern images of Virgo) 

Western astrological signs